Francisco Aguilar Fernández (born 10 May 1952) is a Spanish retired footballer who played as a forward.

Football career
Aguilar was born in Córdoba, Andalusia. After playing with Elche CF and Rayo Vallecano, competing with the former in La Liga in 1973–74, he joined Atlético Madrid in March 1975, going on remain with the club a further five full seasons in the top flight.

With the Colchoneros Aguilar was mainly a reserve, but contributed with 18 games and two goals as the club won the 1977 national championship. He also appeared the full 90 minutes in the second match of the 1974 Intercontinental Cup against Club Atlético Independiente, helping the hosts win it 2–0 and overcome the 0–1 first-leg deficit to conquer the tournament.

Aguilar retired from the professional football at the end of the 1980–81 campaign, suffering Segunda División relegation with Granada CF.

Honours
Atlético Madrid
Intercontinental Cup: 1974
La Liga: 1976–77
Copa del Rey: 1975–76

References

External links
 

1952 births
Living people
Spanish footballers
Footballers from Córdoba, Spain
Association football forwards
La Liga players
Segunda División players
Elche CF players
Rayo Vallecano players
Atlético Madrid footballers
Granada CF footballers
Spain amateur international footballers